Canaqueese was a Mohawk war chief and intercultural mediator who lived in the 17th century in the Mohawk Valley, an area of central present-day New York state, United States. He was of mixed race, with a Mohawk mother and Dutch father, brought up with and identifying as Mohawk. He was an important intermediary among the French, Dutch, the Algonquian-speaking Mahican (Mohican), and the Iroquoian-speaking Mohawk peoples. This was especially so during the Beaver Wars, which arose over competition for the lucrative fur trade. He participated in numerous attempts to reach a peace agreement between the Mohawk and the French based in Quebec (or New France).

He was referred to by different names by representatives of the various national groups with whom he interacted. Canaqueese was his Mohawk name. Smits Jan was his Dutch name, one that he was probably given at baptism or while dealing with the Dutch in New Netherland. Smits Jon was an anglicized version of his Dutch name, given to him by the English after they captured New Netherland in 1664 (renaming it New York). "Flemish Bastard" was the name given to him by French Jesuit missionaries, who described him as "an execrable issue of sin, the monstrous offspring of a Dutch Heretic father and a pagan woman."

Background
Since the late 20th century, historians are reassessing the area of the upper Hudson River, Mohawk River and St. Lawrence River as a shifting borderland of alliances and conflicts. There were no national boundaries between the English and French colonies, nor between the territories of the Algonquian-speaking nations along the Hudson and the New England coast, for instance, and the Five Nations of the Iroquois Confederacy. Certain Native Americans such as Canaqueese played a role with each of the ethnic groups.  He always acted to protect the interests of the Mohawk.

Early life
Canaqueese was born in the 17th century near the site of the Dutch frontier village of Schenectady to a Mohawk mother and a Dutch father. In the matrilineal kinship system of the Mohawk, children were considered born into the mother's clan and deriving their status from her family, through which inheritance and property were passed. The mother's eldest brother was more important to the children than their biological father. Canaqueese likely was brought up by his mother with her people and identifying as Mohawk, while learning Dutch and making use of familiarity with Dutch culture.

He was not mentioned in the historical records until 1650, recorded then as leading a band of Mohawk warriors in an attack on the French settlement at Trois Rivières. This was during the First French–Iroquois War (ca. 1650–1667).

Dutch sources do not note his Dutch paternity, which may suggest that he appeared Mohawk in dress and in custom. The Relations of the French Jesuits were the only source that marked him as a person of paternal Dutch descent.
Canaqueese probably participated in the Mourning Wars of the late 1640s. In these wars, the Seneca and Mohawk allied to attack, and eventually destroy, the Huron Confederacy of Southern Ontario. There are no records that prove Canaqueese was involved in these wars. But Iroquois warriors were promoted based on merit, and he was referred to as a war chief in the Jesuit Relations that recounted the 1650 Mohawk attack on Trois-Rivières. This suggests that Canaqueese had already proven his skill in previous battles, which would most likely have been the Mourning Wars.

Affiliations
Canaqueese drew from his mixed-race background and learned Dutch to act as an interpreter and courier between both colonial and native groups. In that period and under the Mohawk matrilineal system, he identified with his mother's clan as fully Mohawk. He learned Dutch in addition to Mohawk, in part through the trading of beaver pelts in the summer months with Dutch officials in Fort Orange, Rensslaerswick and Beverwijck.

After the Dutch began to work with Canaqueese, they enlisted him as a courier, carrying letters from Fort Orange to Canada in 1653 to facilitate a peace agreement between the French and Mohawk during the First French–Iroquois War (ca. 1650–1667).  The Dutch also recommended Canaqueese to the French as a negotiator, describing him in letters as a "savage much loved by the Mohawk." Canaqueese's biculturalism was an important factor in his role as a mediator. In 1663 he served as a mediator between the Dutch and Algonquian-speaking peoples in the Upper Hudson Valley.

Through his intermediary efforts, Canaqueese also strengthened his status with the Mohawk, as he gained important information on European policies and plans related to his people.

"Chimney" speech
In 1654, concerned that relations between the French and the other Iroquois nations threatened Mohawk control over trade with the Europeans, Canaqueese went on two diplomatic journeys to Canada. During these journeys, he warned the French that they should work directly with the Mohawk, who considered themselves to be the leaders of the Iroquois nations, instead of with the Onondaga, who were located to the west of the Mohawk. The Five Nations together frequently referred to themselves as the Longhouse, or "the completed cabin", a symbol of their binding ties to each other.

Canaqueese's speech to some of the Jesuit missionaries, including Father Simon Le Moyne, was recorded as follows:
Ought not one to enter a house by the door, and not by the chimney or roof of the cabin, unless he be a thief, and wish to take the inmates by surprise? We, the five Iroquois Nations, compose but one cabin; we maintain but one fire; and we have, from time immemorial, dwelt under one and the same roof. Well, then, will you not enter the cabin by the door, which is at the ground floor of the house? It is with us [Mohawk], that you should begin; whereas you, by beginning with the [Onondagas], try to enter by the roof and through the chimney. Have you no fear that the smoke may blind you, our fire not being extinguished, and that you may fall from the top to the bottom, having nothing solid on which to plant your feet?

Despite their efforts, the Mohawk could not keep a monopoly on trade with the Europeans. According to the Jesuit Relations, the Mohawk tried to prevent Father Le Moyne from going to the Onondaga, and when he travelled west anyway, they held him and his party captive.  Eventually, the Onondaga convinced the Mohawks to allow Father Le Moyne to continue on his journey. This event highlighted the tension among the Iroquois nations, despite their claims of being a united group. The lucrative trade with Europeans was a prize that many tribes competed for.

Beaver Wars
Chief Canaqueese played a role as both a military leader and a mediator in the Beaver Wars, a series of conflicts over the fur trade between the French and the Iroquois that took place during the mid-17th century.

Although Canaqueese is first mentioned as a war chief in 1650, when he led an attack on Trois-Rivières, he likely had earned the title by participating in the earlier Iroquois-Huron conflicts of the 1640s. References to Canaqueese during the so-called Beaver Wars largely highlight his role as a mediator between the Mohawk and French. From 1653 to 1654, Canaqueese delivered letters between Fort Orange and Quebec to facilitate achieving a peace treaty between the French and the Mohawk. Throughout the course of these negotiations, he also drew on his connections with the Dutch, who wrote a letter recommending Canaqueese to the French, and assuring them of the Mohawk's honourable intentions. Canaqueese's reputation played a pivotal role in securing the peace settlement, and his work as mediator assuaged the French representatives' initial skepticism about the Mohawk commitment to peace.  Shortly after this, Canaqueese gave his famous speech about Iroquois diplomatic policy in Quebec.

In the late 1660s, Canaqueese again played an important mediating role in establishing peace between the Mohawk and French. In July 1666, aware that the French were preparing an attack on Mohawk lands, a group of Mohawk warriors ambushed some French officers in Lake Champlain, killing seven and taking four prisoner. In response, Governor Alexandre de Prouville de Tracy imprisoned several members of an Oneida people delegation who were in Quebec. Canaqueese and three other Mohawk headmen traveled Quebec to exchange the prisoners and ratify a peace treaty between the two nations.  These Mohawk leaders were troubled by the lack of support that their English and Dutch allies were providing, and had decided to seek peace with the French.

The delegation arrived August 28, but talks broke down in early September when Governor de Tracy imprisoned the Mohawk delegates. During the fall of 1666, violence between the French and Mohawk resumed. Canaqueese was released from custody in November by Intendant Jean Talon, and sent back to Mohawk country with an official offer for peace. The Mohawk were required to release some of their Huron, Algonquin, and French captives, who had been adopted into Mohawk villages according to their practice.

After Canaqueese made a series of diplomatic missions in spring 1667, peace between the Mohawks and French was achieved and the Mohawk released some captives. This peace settlement lasted for more than a decade. Some Mohawk migrated to Montreal, settling nearby in the St. Lawrence Valley, including Canaqueese in 1667.

Fighting against Iroquois with Denonville
Canaqueese is not mentioned again in any sources until 1687, when he is listed as one of the "Christian Iroquois" who fought against the Seneca people with the forces of Governor Denonville.  Mark Meuwese argues that attacking Iroquoia was "not necessarily an indication of his abandonment of an Iroquois identity," but that "since the Iroquois refugee communities on the St. Lawrence Valley were politically independent from the Five Nations, the Flemish Bastard may have sincerely viewed the Senecas as an obstacle to the interests of the Christian Indians." For the converted Catholic Mohawk who settled near the French, their conceptions of Iroquois alliance appear to have altered. Some allied with the French in actions against their ancestral communities.

References

External links
 The Role of Chief Canagueese in the Iroquois Wars

Canadian Mohawk people
17th-century indigenous people of the Americas
17th-century Canadian people